Dharashiv caves are the nexus of 7 caves located 8 km away from Osmanabad city, now renamed as Dharashiv city, in Balaghat mountains in Maharashtra state of India. The caves were taken note by Archaeological Department of India and mentioned in the book Archaeological survey of India by James Burges. Dharashiv Caves have been declared as Protected area by Government of Maharashtra.

History
Dharashiv caves are believed to be built around 5th-7th century. First cave has been discovered in 10th century during the age of Rashtrakutas, while there have been debates over caves whether they are Buddhist or Jain creations. It is believed that these caves were originally Buddhist, but were later converted into monuments of the Jain religion.

Caves

There are 7 caves, 1st cave is harnessed by 20 pillars of scaffolding. Cave No. 2 is among major caves and modeled on the plan of the Vakataka caves at Ajantha. It has a central hall measuring 80 feet by 80 feet, with 14 cells for the residence of the Bhiksus and garbhagraha with a statue of the Gautam Buddha in Padmasana. 3rd cave resembles with 1st, while later caves are Jain caves.

Current status
Dharashiv caves are claimed by both Buddhist and Jain traditions. However research done by James Burges on 1200 caves in Maharashtra state showed that Dharashiv caves were originally a Buddhists caves in 5th century AD, while in 12th century some caves were converted to Jain caves.

See also
 Ajanta Caves
 Ellora Caves
 Tulja Bhavani Temple

References

Tourist attractions in Osmanabad district
Buddhist caves in India
Indian rock-cut architecture
Caves of Maharashtra
Jain rock-cut architecture
12th-century Jain temples
Jain caves in India